The Revenge of Count Silvain (German:Graf Sylvains Rache) is a 1920 German silent comedy film directed by Willy Grunwald and starring Asta Nielsen.

Cast
 Curt Goetz as Graf Sylvain  
 Asta Nielsen as Madelaine  
 Ernst Hofmann as Vicomte Emile  
 Karl Platen as Kammerdiener Jean  
 Mathilde Wieder as Kammerzofe Lucie

References

Bibliography
 Lloyd, Ann. Movies of the Silent Years. Orbis, 1984.

External links

1920 films
Films of the Weimar Republic
German silent feature films
German black-and-white films
1920 comedy films
German comedy films
Silent comedy films
1920s German films